RSUD Station is a station of the Palembang LRT Line 1. Nearby the station is Siti Fatimah Regional General Hospital of South Sumatra Province (RSUD Siti Fatimah Provinsi Sumatera Selatan), hence its name.

The station was opened on 25 September 2018, a day after the opening of Punti Kayu station.

Station layout

References

Palembang
Railway stations in South Sumatra
Railway stations opened in 2018